The Football tournament of the 2009 Lusophony Games was played in Lisbon, Portugal. The venue was the Estádio José Gomes and Estádio Nacional. The tournament was played from 11  to 19 July 2009, and there was just the men's competition.

Football medal table by country

Men's competition

Round Robin

See also
ACOLOP
Lusophony Games
2009 Lusophony Games

football
2009
2009
2009–10 in Portuguese football
2009–10 in Indian football
2009 in African football
2009 in Asian football